Rhodopina tubericollis is a species of beetle in the family Cerambycidae. It was described by Stephan von Breuning in 1943. It is known from Borneo.

References

tubericollis
Beetles described in 1943